Thailand competed at the 2020 Summer Olympics in Tokyo. Originally scheduled to take place from 24 July to 9 August 2020, the Games were postponed to 23 July to 8 August 2021, because of the COVID-19 pandemic. Since the nation's official debut in 1952, Thai athletes have appeared in every edition of the Summer Olympic Games, with the exception of the 1980 Summer Olympics in Moscow, because of its partial support of the US-led boycott.

Medalists

Competitors
The following is the list of number of competitors in the Games.

Athletics

Thai athletes further achieved the entry standards, either by qualifying time or by world ranking, in the following track and field events (up to a maximum of 3 athletes in each event):

Track & road events

Field events

Badminton

Thailand entered seven badminton players for each of the following events into the Olympic tournament based on the BWF Race to Tokyo Rankings.

Men

Women

Mixed

Boxing 

Thailand entered five boxers (two men and three women) into the Olympic tournament. 2018 Asian Games and world silver medalist Sudaporn Seesondee (women's lightweight) and teenagers Thitisan Panmot (men's flyweight) and Baison Manikon (women's welterweight), with men's featherweight boxer Chatchai Butdee going to his third consecutive Games, secured the spots on the Thai squad in their respective weight divisions, either by advancing to the semifinal match or by scoring a box-off triumph, at the 2020 Asia & Oceania Qualification Tournament in Amman, Jordan. Meanwhile, Jutmas Jitpong completed the nation's boxing lineup by topping the list of eligible boxers from Asia and Oceania in the women's flyweight division of the IOC's Boxing Task Force Rankings.

Canoeing

Sprint
Thailand qualified a single boat (women's C-1 200 m) for the Games by winning the gold medal at the 2021 Asian Canoe Sprint Qualification Regatta in Pattaya, marking the country's debut in the sporting discipline.

Qualification Legend: FA = Qualify to final (medal); FB = Qualify to final B (non-medal)

Cycling

Road
Thailand entered one rider to compete in the women's Olympic road race, by virtue of her top 100 individual finish (for women) in the UCI World Ranking.

BMX
Thailand received one quota spot for women's BMX race at the Olympics, as a result of the UCI BMX Olympic Qualification List.

Equestrian

Thailand fielded a squad of three equestrian riders for the first time into the Olympic team eventing competition by securing an outright berth as one of two top-ranked nations, not yet qualified, at the International Equestrian Federation (FEI)-designated Olympic qualifier for Group F and G (Africa, Middle East, Asia and Oceania) in Saumur, France.

Eventing
The Thai eventing team was announced on May 30, 2021.

Golf

Thailand entered  four (two male and two female) golfers into the Olympic tournament. Jazz Janewattananond and Gunn Charoenkul qualified directly among the top 60 eligible players for the men's event. Patty Tavatanakit and Ariya Jutanugarn also qualified for the women's event.

Judo

Thailand entered one female judoka into the Olympic tournament based on the International Judo Federation Olympics Individual Ranking.

Rowing

Thailand qualified one boat in the men's lightweight double sculls for the Games by finishing second at the B-final and securing the last of three berths available at the 2021 FISA Asia & Oceania Olympic Qualification Regatta in Tokyo, Japan.

Qualification Legend: FA=Final A (medal); FB=Final B (non-medal); FC=Final C (non-medal); FD=Final D (non-medal); FE=Final E (non-medal); FF=Final F (non-medal); SA/B=Semifinals A/B; SC/D=Semifinals C/D; SE/F=Semifinals E/F; QF=Quarterfinals; R=Repechage

Sailing

Thai sailors qualified one boat in each of the following classes through the class-associated World Championships, and the continental regattas.

M = Medal race; EL = Eliminated – did not advance into the medal race

Shooting

Thai shooters achieved quota places for the following events by virtue of their best finishes at the 2018 ISSF World Championships, the 2019 ISSF World Cup series, and Asian Championships, as long as they obtained a minimum qualifying score (MQS) by May 31, 2020.

Swimming

Thailand received a universality invitation from FINA to send two top-ranked swimmers (one per gender) in their respective individual events to the Olympics, based on the FINA Points System of June 28, 2021.

Table tennis

Thailand entered two athletes into the table tennis competition at the Games. Rio 2016 Olympian Suthasini Sawettabut scored a repechage play-off victory to book the last of the five available places in the women's singles at the 2021 ITTF World Qualification Tournament in Doha, Qatar. Orawan Paranang topped the field of table tennis players from Southeast Asia in the round robin at the Asian Qualification Tournament, thereby joining Sawettabut on the country's roster for her maiden Games.

Taekwondo

Thailand entered two athletes into the taekwondo competition at the Games. Rio 2016 bronze medalist Panipak Wongpattanakit qualified directly for the women's flyweight category (49 kg) by finishing among the top five taekwondo practitioners at the end of the WT Olympic Rankings. On the men's side, Ramnarong Sawekwiharee scored a semifinal victory in the flyweight category (58 kg) to book the remaining spot on the Thai taekwondo squad at the 2021 Asian Qualification Tournament in Amman, Jordan.

References

Nations at the 2020 Summer Olympics
2020
2021 in Thai sport